Elections to provincial (municipal), city (district) and county people's assemblies(도(직할시)·시(구역)·군 인민회의 대의원 선거) were held in North Korea on July 19, 2015.

Voter turnout was reported at 99.97%, with 28,452 deputies elected to local people's assemblies.

See also

Elections in North Korea

References

Local elections in North Korea
2015 in North Korea
North